The 2007 Bayelsa State gubernatorial election was the 3rd gubernatorial election of Bayelsa State. Held on April 14, 2007, the People's Democratic Party nominee Timipre Sylva won the election, defeating Ebitimi Amgbare of the Action Congress of Nigeria.

Results 
Timipre Sylva from the People's Democratic Party won the election, defeating Ebitimi Amgbare from the Action Congress of Nigeria. Registered voters was 955,279.

References 

Bayelsa State gubernatorial elections
Bayelsa 
Bayelsa State gubernatorial election
gubernatorial